Avvaiyar (Tamil: ஔவையார்) was the title of more than one female poet who were active during different periods of Tamil literature. They were some of the most famous and important female poets of the Tamil canon.

Abidhana Chintamani states that there were three female poets titled Avvaiyar. Among them, the first Avvaiyar lived during the Sangam period (c. 3rd century BCE) and is said to have had cordial relations with the Tamil chieftains Vēl Pāri and Athiyamān. She wrote 59 poems in the Puṟanāṉūṟu.

Avvaiyar II lived during the period of Kambar and Ottakoothar during the reign of the Chola dynasty in the tenth century. She is often imagined as an old and intelligent lady by Tamil people. Many poems and the Avvai Kural, comprising 310 kurals in 31 chapters, belong to this period.

The third Avvaiyar is the most widely known for her 'Vinayagar Agaval', 'Aathichoodi', 'Kondrai Vendhan', 'Nalvazhi' and 'Moodhurai'.

Name etymology
The name Avvaiyar is a combination of Tamil word avvai with honorific suffix ar. Avvai refers to 'respectable elderly woman' as the word ammai which means 'good woman' in general term for a woman of any age. Thus the name Avvaiyar means a 'respectable good woman', hence a generic title rather than a specific name of a person.

Sangam-age Avvaiyar
The Avvaiyar who lived during the Sangam period is considered to be contemporary to poets Paranar, Kabilar and Thiruvalluvar. She is attributed as the author of 7 verses in Naṟṟiṇai, 15 in Kuṟuntokai, 4 in Akanaṉūṟu and 33 in Puṟanāṉūṟu. Legend states that she was a court poet of the rulers of the Tamil country. She travelled from one part of the country to another and from one village to another, sharing the gruel of the poor farmers and composing songs for their enjoyment. Most of her songs were about a small-time chieftain Vallal Athiyamaan Nedumaan Anji and his family. The chieftain had also used her as his ambassador to avert war with another neighbouring chieftain Thondaiman. The rest of her songs related to the various aspects of state governance. Although traditions claim that she was a sister of Kabilar, Thiruvalluvar and Athiyamaan, V. R. Ramachandra Dikshitar refutes this claim based on his studies that all four of them were most likely of different walks of life, thus from different caste backgrounds and hence impossible to be siblings. Tirukkovilur is an ancient temple town in Tamil Nadu. This is where the demon Andhaka was killed by Lord Shiva. Sangam epics recount that it was here that Avvayar was blessed with a vision of her lord slaying Andhaka and she has dedicated verses to the same. At great ancient temple of Thillai Chidambaram she sang Vinayakar Thiruakaval when Lord Ganesha displayed his dancing form to her. Vinayakar Thiruakaval is an extremely esoteric work.

View on Valluvar and the Kural
It is said that Avvaiyar was one of the several scholars who were present at the time when Valluvar submitted his masterpiece of the Tirukkural at the Madurai College. Soon after the presentation and the subsequent acceptance by the scholars and the Pandiyan King, Idaikkadar praised Valluvar and the Kural text thus:

On hearing this, Avvaiyar remarked to him that it would be more appropriate to liken the Kural text to an atom, which is even smaller than a mustard seed. Both Idaikaadar and Avvaiyar's remarks appear as the last two verses of the Tiruvalluva Maalai.

Chola-age Avvaiyar

The medieval period Avvaiyar was the court poet of the Chola monarch and was the contemporary of Kambar and Ottakkuttar. She found great happiness in the life of small children. Her works, Ātticcūṭi and Konraiventhan, written for young children, are even now generally read and enjoyed by them.

Her two other works, Mooturai and Nalvali were written for older children. All the four works are didactic in character – they explain the basic wisdom that should govern mundane life.

Quotes

The following quotes from Aathichoodi illustrate the simplicity of her style and profoundness of the messages:

 
"Thol Ulagil Nallaar Oruvar Ularael Avar Poruttu Ellarkum Peiyum Mazhai" – The rain falls on behalf of the virtuous, benefitting everyone in the world.

"Nandri Oruvarukku Seithakkal An Nandri Endru tharum kol ena vaenda nindru Thalara valar thengu Thaanunda Neerai Thalaiyaalae Thaan Tharuthalal" -Don't wait for a return benefit as to when a good deed done will pay back, but be just like that tall and erect coconut tree that drank water from its feet gives the benefit of giving that sweet water by its head."

Her quote "கற்றது கைமண் அளவு, கல்லாதது உலகளவு" has been translated as "What you have learned is a mere handful; What you haven't learned is the size of the world" and exhibited at NASA. Her famous works include:

 Vinayagar Agaval

Shrine
In Muppandal, a small village in the Kanyakumari District of Tamil Nadu.  there is an image of Avvaiyar. By tradition, this is stated to be the spot where the great poet left the mortal world.

Avvai Vizha
Annual Avvai Vizha is organised and conducted by the Government of Tamil Nadu to commemorate Avvaiyar's contribution to Tamil literature. This festival is celebrated every year in the month of Panguni on Sadhayam star day. Avvai Vizha has been started by local community long time back and still continuing willingly. Now Government of Tamil Nadu is continuing this function and adding more values. Local community, Tamil scholars and scholars from various fields participating with passion on this occasion and deliver their speech. Avvai Vizha is conducted in the temple Avvayar situated at Thulasiyappattinam village, Vedaranyam, Nagappatinam District, in the temple premises of Arulmigu Visvanathaswamy Thirukovil. Also this place is referred to famous interaction between Lord Muruga and Avvaiyar "Suttapazham Venduma Sudatha Pazham Venduma". This temple is under the control of the Hindu Religious and Charitable Endowments Department.

Legend
A popular legend in Tamil is the story of the first Avvaiyar and the Naaval (Jambu) tree. Avvaiyar, believing she had achieved everything that is to be achieved, was pondering her retirement from Tamil literary work while resting under a Naaval tree. She was then met by a disguised Murugan (regarded as one of the guardian deities of the Tamil language; the god of war, victory, and knowledge), who jousted with her wittily. He later revealed himself and made her realise that there was still a lot more to be done and learned. Following this awakening, Avvaiyar is believed to have undertaken a fresh set of literary works, targeted at children. These works, even after a millennium, are often among the first works of literature that children are exposed to in Tamil Nadu schools (compare the note to Letitia Elizabeth Landon's poem referenced below under Legacy).

Another legend has it that once the great king Athiyaman gave an "eternal" gooseberry (Nellikani in Tamil) fruit to Avvaiyar I. It was a special fruit that would bestow on whoever ate it a very long and healthy life. Athiyaman wanted Avvaiyar to eat the eternal fruit as she was the right person who could serve the Tamil community. If she could live forever, so would the Tamil heritage and language.

While on a visit to Ceylon, Avvai was caught up in torrential rain, and took shelter in the house of two women of lower caste, Angavay and Sangavay. These women took care of Avvai with great kindness and the poet promised that they would be given in marriage to the King of Tirucovalur. On hearing this the King agreed to take the women in marriage if they were given away by the Chera, Chola and the Pandya kings. Avvai then made an invocation to Ganesha for making the invitation on a palmyra leaf, on which Ganesha appeared before her. On receiving the invitation the kings from the three kingdoms come to the wedding ceremony and gave Angavay and Sangavay away in marriage. (pp. 57–59).

Legacy 
In her poetical illustration  of 1835, Letitia Elizabeth Landon writes of Avvaiyar(Avyia)'s triumph and calls her 'One who upon the scroll Flung the creative soul, Disdainful of life's flowers and of its rest.'

In 1991, a 20.6 km-wide crater in Venus was named the Avviyar crater, after the ancient Avvaiyar, by the International Astronomical Union.

Publication in the United States
In 2009, Red Hen Press published a selection of Avvaiyar's poetry from the 12th century, entitled Give, Eat, and Live: Poems by Avviyar. The poems were selected and translated into English by Thomas Pruiksma, a poet and translator who discovered Avviyar's work while on a Fulbright scholarship at The American College in Madurai, Tamil Nadu, India.

Further reading
 Subramanyam, K. (1974). A Look at Some Tamil Classics. Indian Literature, 17(1/2), pp. 204–216.
 Pruiksma, T. H. (2009). Give, eat, and live: Poems of Avvaiyar. Los Angeles, CA: Red Hen Press.
 Sivakumar, R. (2000). Sangam Poetry. Indian Literature, 44(2 (196)), pp. 182–192. 
 Thompson, M. S. H. (1948). The Avvai of the Sangam Anthologies. Bulletin of the School of Oriental and African Studies, the University of London, 12(2), pp. 399–402.

See also

 Aathichoodi
 Abithana Chintamani
 Thiruvalluvar
 Thirukural
 List of Sangam poets
 Sangam literature
 Tiruvalluva Maalai

Notes

References

 
 Krishnamurti, Dr. C.R.  (Professor Emeritus, University of British Columbia, Vancouver, B.C. Canada) Thamizh Literature Through the Ages 
 Project Madurai – Purananuru eText – http://tamilnation.org/literature/ettuthokai/pm0057.pdf
 Project madurai – Avvaiyar works in PDF – http://tamilnation.org/literature/auvaiyar/pm002.pdf
 NASA link for citation of Auvaiyar's quote – https://www.nasa.gov/audience/foreducators/informal/features/F_Cosmic_Questions.html
 http://www.aathithamizharperavai.com/home.html
 https://web.archive.org/web/20110308182216/http://www.tn.gov.in/policynotes/archives/policy2004_05/hrce2004-05-3.htm
NASA Venus Nomenclature list which includes Avviyar's name - https://planetarynames.wr.usgs.gov/Feature/512

External links 
 Project Madurai Homepage
 Article in English about Vinayagar Agaval
 Avvaiyar & her Writings
 Aathisoodi Meaning in English  - Translated into English

 Hindu poets
 Tamil poets
 Ancient Indian poets
 Ancient Asian women writers
 Indian women poets
 Hindu female religious leaders
 Tamil epic poets
 Tiruvalluva Maalai contributors
 Sangam poets
 Female poets of the Sangam Age
 Ancient Indian women writers
 Tamil Hindu saints
 Dalit Hindu saints